List of rivers in Maine (U.S. state).

The list is organized by tributary structure, from north to south along the coast.

Saint John River

Note: Higher part of Saint John River is recuperating water from tributaries of Southeast Quebec

Left bank of Saint John River (Maine)

Saint John River
Southwest Branch Saint John River, Quebec and Maine
Little Southwest Branch Saint John River
Baker Branch Saint John River
Northwest Branch Saint John River
Daaquam River, Quebec and Maine
Big Black River in Maine (Grande rivière Noire in Québec)
Depot River
Brown River, Quebec and Maine
Gobeil River, Quebec and Maine
Shields Branch in Maine (rivière du Rochu in Quebec)
 Fivemile Brook in Maine (Rivière des Cinq Milles in Quebec)
 Twomile Brook in Maine (Rivière des Deux Milles in Quebec)
Little Saint Roch River
Chimenticook River, Maine
 East Lake (Kamouraska), Quebec and Maine
Pocwock River, Quebec and Maine
Pocwock River West Branch, Quebec and Maine
Pocwock River East Branch, Maine
Little Black River in Maine (Rivière Noire in Quebec)
West Branch Little Black River, Quebec and Maine
Campbell Branch Little Black River, Quebec and Maine
St. Francis River in Maine (rivière Saint-François in Quebec)

Right bank of Saint John River (Maine)

Saint John River
Allagash River
Musquacook Stream
Fish River
Red River
Birch River
North Branch Birch River
South Branch Birch River
Little River
Aroostook River
St. Croix Stream
Blackwater River
North Branch Blackwater River
South Branch Blackwater River
Machias River
South Branch Machias River
Little Machias River
Little Madawaska River
River De Chute
Meduxnekeag River
South Branch Meduxnekeag River
North Branch Meduxnekeag River

Down East

St. Croix River
Little River (Big Lake)
Little River (Passamaquoddy Bay)
Pennamaquan River
Hardscrabble River
Dennys River
Orange River
Machias River
West Branch Machias River
Crooked River
Middle River
East Machias River
Maine River
Englishman River
Chandler River
East Branch Chandler River
Sandy River
Indian River
Southwest Branch Indian River
West River
Pleasant River
Western Little River
Little River
West Branch Pleasant River
Harrington River
Mill River
Narraguagus River
West Branch Narraguagus River (Hancock County, Maine)
Little Narraguagus River
West Branch Narraguagus River (Cherryfield, Maine)
Spring River
Skillings River
Jordan River
Union River
East Branch Union River
Bog River
Middle Branch Union River
West Branch Union River
Webb BrookWebb Pond''
Mill Brook
Little Bog River
Benjamin River

Penobscot Bay

Bagaduce River
Penobscot River
East Branch Penobscot River
Seboeis River
Little Seboeis River
West Branch Penobscot River
North Branch Penobscot River
South Branch Penobscot River
Mattawamkeag River
East Branch Mattawamkeag River
West Branch Mattawamkeag River
Molunkus Stream
Piscataquis River
East Branch Piscataquis River
West Branch Piscataquis River
Sebec River
Pleasant River
East Branch Pleasant River
Middle Branch Pleasant River
West Branch Pleasant River
Passadumkeag River
East Branch Passadumkeag River
West Branch Passadumkeag River
Stillwater River
Kenduskeag Stream
North Branch Marsh River
Marsh Stream
South Branch Marsh River
Orland River
Narramissic River
Dead River
Goose River (Belfast Bay)
Passagassawakeag River
Little River
Ducktrap River
Megunticook River
Goose River (Rockport Harbor)

Mid Coast
Weskeag River
Saint George River
Dead River
Back River (Saint George River tributary)
Oyster River
West Branch Oyster River
East Branch Oyster River
Mill River
Meduncook River
Back River (Meduncook River tributary)
Medomak River
Back River (Medomak River tributary)
Goose River
Pemaquid River
Johns River
Eastern Branch Johns River
North Branch Johns River
Damariscotta River
Little River (Damariscotta River tributary)
Sheepscot River
West Branch Sheepscot River
Dyer River
Marsh River
Cross River
Back River (Boothbay, Maine)
Sasanoa River – connects to Kennebec River
Little Sheepscot River
Little River (Georgetown, Maine)

Kennebec River

Kennebec River
Moose River
South Branch Moose River
East Branch Moose River
West Branch Moose River
Roach River
Moxie Stream
Dead River – also called West Branch
North Branch Dead River
South Branch Dead River
Carrabassett River
South Branch Carrabassett River
West Branch Carrabassett River
Sandy River
South Branch Sandy River
Lemon Stream
Sebasticook River
East Branch Sebasticook River
Little River
Eastern River
East Branch Eastern River
West Branch Eastern River
Abagadasset River
Androscoggin River
Rapid River
Cupsuptic River
East Branch Cupsuptic River
Little East Branch Cupsuptic River
Kennebago River
Rangeley River
Magalloway River
West Branch Magalloway River
Third East Branch Magalloway River
Second East Branch Magalloway River
First East Branch Magalloway River
Little Magalloway River
Middle Branch Little Magalloway River
West Branch Little Magalloway River
Dead Cambridge River
Swift Cambridge River
Wild River
Pleasant River
East Branch Pleasant River
West Branch Pleasant River
Alder River
Sunday River
South Branch Sunday River
Bear River
Ellis River
West Branch Ellis River
Concord River
Swift River
West Branch Swift River
East Branch Swift River
Webb River
Dead River (Androscoggin River tributary)
Nezinscot River
East Branch Nezinscot River
West Branch Nezinscot River
Little Androscoggin River
Sanborn River
Sabattus River
Dead River (Sabattus River tributary)
Little River
Muddy River
Cathance River
Sasanoa River – connects to Sheepscot River
Back River (Kennebec River tributary) (connects to Sheepscot River tributary)

Southern Maine
Morse River
Sprague River
New Meadows River
Little River
Harraseeket River
Royal River
Cousins River
Presumpscot River
Tenny River
Songo River
Bear River
Chute River
Crooked River
Muddy River
Northwest River
Sticky River
Pleasant River
Little River
North Branch Little River
Piscataqua River
East Branch Piscataqua River
Fore River
Stroudwater River
South Branch Stroudwater River
Spurwink River
Scarborough River
Dunstan River
Nonesuch River
Libby River

Saco River
Old Course Saco River
Charles River
Cold River
Mad River
Middle Branch Mad River
South Branch Mad River
Little Cold River
Kezar River
Little Saco River
Shepards River
Tenmile River
West Branch Tenmile River
Hancock Brook
Ossipee River
South River
Little River (Ossipee River tributary)
Little Ossipee River
Little River (Goosefare Bay)
Batson River
Kennebunk River
Mousam River
Middle Branch Mousam River
Littlefield River
Little River (Drakes Island, Maine)
Merriland River
Webhannet River
Ogunquit River
Josias River
Cape Neddick River
Little River (York, Maine)
York River
Piscataqua River
Salmon Falls River – also called Newichawannock by the Abenaki
Little River (Salmon Falls River tributary)
Great Works River
Neoutaquet River

See also
 List of lakes in Maine

References
USGS Geographic Names Information Service
Maine Streamflow Data from the USGS
Maine Watershed Data From Environmental Protection Agency

Maine rivers
 
Rivers